Dafydd ap Gruffydd (11 July 1238 – 3 October 1283) was Prince of Wales from 11 December 1282 until his execution on 3 October 1283 on the orders of King Edward I of England. He was the last native Prince of Wales before the conquest of Wales by Edward I in 1283 and English rule in Wales that followed, until Owain Glyndŵr held the title during the Welsh Revolt of 1400–1415.

Early life
He was a prince of Gwynedd, a younger son of Gruffudd ap Llywelyn and his wife, Senena, and thus grandson of Llywelyn Fawr. In 1241, he is recorded as having been handed over to Henry III of England as a hostage with his younger brother, Rhodri, as part of an agreement. He may have come of age under Welsh law on 11 July 1252, on which date he issued, in front of his mother, Senena, and the Bishop of Bangor, a charter as lord of the commote of Cymydmaen, at the outer reaches of the Llŷn Peninsula. In 1253, he was called upon to pay homage to King Henry III of England.

In 1255, he joined his brother, Owain, in a challenge to their brother, Llywelyn, but Llywelyn defeated them at the Battle of Bryn Derwin. Dafydd was imprisoned, but Llywelyn released him the following year and restored him to favour. In 1263, he joined King Henry in an attack on his brother. After Llywelyn was acknowledged by King Henry as Prince of Wales in 1267, Dafydd was again restored to Llywelyn's favour, but in 1274, he joined King Edward I of England to challenge Llywelyn once again. In 1277, following the Treaty of Aberconwy, he was reconciled, finally, with his brother.

Dafydd ap Gruffudd married (sometime after 1265) Lady Elizabeth Ferrers, daughter of William de Ferrers, 5th Earl of Derby, and the widow of William Marshal, 2nd Baron Marshal (not the Earl of Pembroke). Through the marriage Dafydd came into possession of the manor of Folesham, Norfolk. He exchanged Folesham with John Marshal for the manor of Norton, Northamptonshire. In September 1278, he accepted a grant for life from Edward l, King of England, of the manor of Frodsham, near Chester.

Struggle for Wales
 
On Easter 1282, Dafydd ap Gruffudd attacked Hawarden Castle, thereby starting the final conflict with Plantagenet-ruled England, in the course of which Welsh independence was lost. Archbishop John Peckham tried to intervene in the war by suggesting that Llywelyn accept land in England in return for surrendering to Edward I, while Dafydd was supposed to go on crusade at the king's expense. Both princes turned the offer down. In December his older brother Llywelyn ap Gruffudd, Prince of Wales, had been lured into what was probably a trap and killed by the English on 11 December 1282 (see corr. of Archbishop John Peckham, Lambeth Palace Archives) . Dafydd succeeded Llywelyn as Prince of Wales, and held the title for 10 months after his brother's death.

By January 1283, Edward I of England surrounded Dafydd's base of Snowdonia with a massive army. Dafydd initially operated from Dolwyddelan and was supported by various royal refugees from Powys Fadog and Deheubarth; including Rhys Wyndod, Rhys Ieuanc and the sons of Maredudd ab Owain. With limited resources of manpower and equipment available the passes leading to Dolwyddelan became indefensible and Dafydd moved down to Castell y Bere. In April, Castell y Bere was besieged by over 3,000 men, and the small Welsh garrison, commanded by Cynfrig ap Madog, surrendered on 25 April. Dafydd escaped the siege and moved north to Dolbadarn Castle, a guardpost in the Peris Valley at the foot of Snowdon.  In May 1283, he was forced to move again, this time to the mountains above the Welsh royal home in Abergwyngregyn. 

 "Those who survived fled for refuge to the inaccessible rocks of Snowdonia and David with a few followers hid himself for some months at different places and suffered hunger and cold. At last he retreated to a bog (Nanhysglain), near Bera Mawr about four miles above Aber with his wife two sons and seven daughters. His place of retreat was known to Einion Bishop of Bangor and Gronw ab Dafydd, who basely betrayed him."

Capture and execution 
On 22 June, Dafydd and his younger son Owain ap Dafydd were captured at Nanhysglain, a secret hiding place in a bog by Bera Mountain to the south of Abergwyngregyn.  Dafydd, seriously wounded (graviter vulneratus) in the struggle, was brought to King Edward's camp at Rhuddlan that same night (Cotton Vesp. B xi, f30). Dafydd was taken from here to Chester and then on to Shrewsbury. Dafydd's wife Elizabeth de Ferrers, their daughter Gwladys, infant niece Gwenllian ferch Llywelyn, and Dafydd's six illegitimate daughters were also taken prisoner at the same time. Whether they were with Dafydd and Owain at Bera is not recorded, but it is likely.

On 28 June, Llywelyn ap Dafydd (son of Dafydd ap Gruffydd) was also captured. Edward triumphantly proclaimed that the last of the "treacherous lineage", princes of the "turbulent nation", was now in his grasp, captured by men of his own nation (per homines linguae suae). Welsh resistance to the invasion temporarily came to an end. That day, Edward issued writs to summon a parliament to meet at Shrewsbury, to discuss Dafydd's fate.

On 30 September, Dafydd ap Gruffudd, Prince of Wales, was condemned to death, the first person known to have been tried and executed for what from that time onwards would be described as high treason against the King. Edward ensured that Dafydd's death was slow and agonising, and also historic; he became the first prominent person in recorded history to have been hanged, drawn and quartered, preceded by a number of minor knights earlier in the thirteenth century. Dafydd was dragged through the streets of Shrewsbury attached to a horse's tail, then hanged alive, revived, then disembowelled and his entrails burned before him for "his sacrilege in committing his crimes in the week of Christ's passion", and then his body cut into four-quarters "for plotting the king's death". Geoffrey of Shrewsbury was paid 20 shillings for carrying out the gruesome act on 3 October 1283.

Dafydd's daughter Gwladys, like her cousin Gwenllian ferch Llywelyn, was sent to a convent in Lincolnshire – Gwenllian to Sempringham and Gwladys to Sixhills, where she died in 1336. Dafydd's sons were both imprisoned at Bristol Castle: Llywelyn ap Dafydd died at Bristol Castle in mysterious circumstances in 1287 or 1288, while Owain ap Dafydd is last found living in August 1325. Non-contemporary genealogies also attribute to Dafydd and an otherwise unknown Welsh woman, Tangwystl ferch Owain Fflam, an illegitimate son named Dafydd Goch of Penmachno, who survived, though there is no contemporary evidence to support the relationship.

One cadet member of the ruling House of Aberffraw also survived, Madog ap Llywelyn, who led a nationwide revolt in 1294–95.

References
Riley Willelmi Rishanger: quondam Monachi S. Albani, Chronica et Annales (Rolls Ser. 28) (1865): 91 (“David, fuga dilapsus, multis annis cum Rege Angliæ stetit; a quo, contra morem gentis suæ, miles factus, in ista guerra, ob probitatem et fidelitatem suam, plurimum erat Regi acceptus: unde et eidem castrum de Dimby [Denbigh] contulit in Wallia, cum terris ad valorem mille librarum annui redditus; insuper et uxorem dedit, filiam Comitis Derbeyæ, quæ nuper alio viro fuerat viduata.") [also see Hog F. Nicholai Triveti, de ordine frat. praedicatorum, Annales (English Hist. Soc.) (1865): 298].  
Luard Annales Monastici 3 (Rolls Ser. 36) (1866): 298 (Annals of Dunstable sub A.D. 1283: "Eodem anno David, germanus Leulini, principis Walliæ, captus est per gentem domini regis ...et filius suus legitimus captus est cum eo .... Uxor etiam ipsius David, quæ fuit filia comitis de Ferares, alias capta est et inprisonata.").  
Bellamy, J. G. The Law of Treason in England in the Later Middle Ages (Cambridge University Press, 1970)
Maud, Ralph, David the last prince of Wales. The Ten "lost" months of Welsh History.
Pryce, Huw (ed.) The Acts of Welsh Rulers 1120–1283 (Cardiff, 2005)
Smith, J. Beverley Llywelyn ap Gruffudd, Prince of Wales (Cardiff, 1998), p. 579

Notes

Works cited

Executed monarchs
People executed under the Plantagenets by hanging, drawing and quartering
People executed under the Plantagenets for treason against England
1238 births
1283 deaths
House of Cunedda
Executed Welsh people
History of Gwynedd
13th-century Welsh monarchs
Monarchs taken prisoner in wartime